Uroš Živanović (born 30 June 2005) is a Serbian competitive swimmer. He won the world junior title and gold medal in the 50-metre breaststroke and the silver medal in the 100-metre breaststroke at the 2022 World Junior Championships. At the 2022 European Junior Championships, he won the bronze medal in the 50-metre breaststroke.

Background
Živanović was born 30 June 2005 in Serbia. He attends Gimnazija in Leskovac. He trains with and competes for swim club Dubočica.

Career

2021–2022
In July 2021, at the 2021 European Junior Swimming Championships, held in Rome, Italy, Živanović placed ninth in the 50-metre breaststroke with a time of 28.31 seconds, ninth in the 100-metre breaststroke with a time of 1:02.56, twelfth in the 4×100-metre mixed freestyle relay, 57th in the 50-metre butterfly with a 26.92, and 72nd in the 50-metre freestyle with a time of 24.72 seconds. At the 2022 European Junior Swimming Championships, held the following July in Otopeni, Romania, he won the bronze medal with a time of 27.69 seconds after swimming a personal best time of 27.64 seconds in the semifinals. In the 200-metre breaststroke, he swam a personal best time of 2:18.86 in the preliminary heats before placing fourteenth overall in the semifinals with a 2:19.25. In his third event of the Championships, the 100-metre breaststroke, he placed fourth with a time of 1:01.85, finishing 0.53 seconds behind bronze medalist Steijn Louter of the Netherlands.

2022 European Aquatics Championships
Živanović qualified for the 2022 European Aquatics Championships, contested starting 11 August at Foro Italico in Rome, Italy, in the 100-metre breaststroke and also entered to compete in the 50-metre breaststroke, 50-metre freestyle, and 100-metre freestyle. The first day of competition, he placed 33rd in the 100-metre breaststroke with a time of 1:03.00. On the second day, he finished in a personal best time of 52.10 seconds in the 100-metre freestyle preliminary heats to place 67th overall. Day four, he split a 50.59 for the anchor leg of the 4×100-metre freestyle relay to help place twelfth with a time of 3:18.15 in the preliminary heats. In the 50-metre breaststroke preliminary heats on day five, he placed 32nd overall with a time of 28.47 seconds. For his final event, he placed 66th in the 50-metre freestyle preliminary heats on day six with a personal best time of 23.98 seconds.

2022 World Junior Championships

On day one of competition at the 2022 FINA World Junior Swimming Championships in Lima, Peru, Živanović ranked fourth in the preliminaries of the 100-metre breaststroke with a 1:02.64 and advanced to the semifinals. In the evening semifinals, he lowered his time to a 1:02.46 and qualified for the final ranking seconds. For the final the following day, he achieved a personal best time of 1:01.64 and won the silver medal, finishing 0.34 seconds behind gold medalist Luka Mladenovic of Austria. Three days later, he finished in a time of 28.30 seconds in the preliminary heats of the 50-metre breaststroke, advancing to the semifinals ranking first. Lowering his time to a 28.08 in the semifinals later in the day, he ranked first and qualified for the final. In the final the next day, he won the gold medal with a time of 27.70 seconds, which was over five-tenths of a second ahead of silver medalist Alex Sabattani of Italy and bronze medalist Luka Mladenovic. Returning home to Leskovac following his performances, he received a welcome reception at his school, Gimnazija, which included the director of the school.

2022 Swimming World Cup
At the 2022 FINA Swimming World Cup conducted in short course metres (25-metre pool) in October in Berlin, Germany, Živanović placed seventeenth in the 200-metre breaststrkoe with a 2:14.38, nineteenth in the 100-metre breaststroke with a 1:00.31, twenty-first in the 50-metre breaststroke with a time of 27.56 seconds (1.12 seconds behind preliminary heats first-ranked Nicolò Martinenghi of Italy), thirty-ninth in the 100-metre individual medley with a 57.28, and ninety-sixth in the 100-metre freestyle with a time of 51.12 seconds.

International championships (50 m)

Personal best times

Long course metres (50 m pool)

Legend: h – preliminary heat; sf – semifinal

Short course metres (25 m pool)

References

External links
 

2005 births
Living people
Sportspeople from Leskovac
Serbian male swimmers
Serbian male freestyle swimmers